The Journal of Film Preservation (JFP) is a journal published twice a year by FIAF, the International Federation of Film Archives.

History and profile
The journal was founded in 1972. It was published under the title of FIAF Information Bulletin from 1972 to 1993. Initially a newsletter for affiliates of FIAF, it has become over the years a more scholarly magazine, offering a forum for both general and specialised discussions on all theoretical, technical and historical aspects of moving image archival activities around the world. It is a trilingual journal – articles are written in English, French or Spanish, and include summaries in the other two languages. A new design, combined with a more modern editorial content was launched in April 2012 with issue #86. Its current editor is Elaine Burrows.

See also
 List of film periodicals

References

External links
 Past issues of the Journal of Film Preservation

1972 establishments in France
Biannual magazines published in France
Film preservation
Film magazines published in France
Magazines about the media
Magazines established in 1972
Magazines published in Paris
Professional and trade magazines